The Welsh Women's Open Stroke Play Championship is the women's national amateur stroke play golf championship of Wales. It was first played in 1976 and is currently organised by Wales Golf.

Winners

Source:

References

External links
Wales Golf

Amateur golf tournaments in the United Kingdom
Golf tournaments in Wales
1976 establishments in Wales
Recurring sporting events established in 1976